Prolecanitidae is a family of ammonites in the order Prolecanitida, with 10 genera.

Genera 
Genera placed by Fossilworks.

 Becanites Korn, 1997
 Cantabricanites Weyer, 1965
 Dombarocanites Ruzhencev, 1949 
 Eocanites Librovitch, 1957
 Katacanites Kullmann, 1963
 Merocanites Schindewolf, 1922 
 Metacanites Schindewolf, 1922
 Michiganites Ruzhencev, 1962
 Prolecanites Mojsisovics, 1882
 Protocanites Schmidt, 1922

References

Prolecanitida